Île Howe is one of the islands of the Kerguelen archipelago, situated to the north of Île Foch, just after Île MacMurdo. It is about 8 km in length.  Apart from rabbits, it is free of introduced animals.

Important Bird Area

The island, along with the neighbouring, and relatively large, islands of Île Foch and Île Saint-Lanne Gramont, as well as the smaller Île MacMurdo, Île Briand, Îles Dayman and Îlots Hallet, has been identified by BirdLife International as an Important Bird Area (IBA) because of its value as a breeding site, especially for seabirds, with at least 29 species nesting in the IBA.

References

 Geoportail - Carte des îles Kerguelen
 Tableau général de la France outre-mer - Maison de la Géographie

Howe
Important Bird Areas of Kerguelen